Humber College is a below-grade light rail transit (LRT) station under construction on Line 6 Finch West, a new line that is part of the Toronto subway system. The station will be located at the southwest corner of Highway 27 and Humber College Boulevard on the Humber College North Campus in Etobicoke, Toronto. The station will be the western terminus of Line 6, which is scheduled to open in 2023. A walkway will connect the LRT station to the nearby Humber College Bus Terminal.

Description
The station will be located below street level in an open trench running parallel to Highway 27. The station will have two street-level entrances, one entrance on the south side of Humber College Boulevard, the second further south facing a new street that will intersect with Highway 27. The entrance structures will be at least  in height, and will each face a  plaza. The centre platform will have several canopies for weather protection. The lack of a roof over the trench will allow natural lighting on the platform. An exterior walkway with a  canopy will link the station to the Humber College campus. Wi-Fi will be available at the station.

Besides Humber College, the station will also serve Etobicoke General Hospital located at the southeast corner of Humber College Boulevard and Highway 27.

The station will have 3 parallel tracks. Two tracks will flank the island platform. The track on the west side of the station will be used for train storage and will have no platform, but will be flanked by service walkways. This arrangement contrasts with stations on the heavy rail subway system, where the two platform tracks continue beyond terminal stations as tail tracks to store trains.    

North of the station, the line continues in a trench beside Highway 27 until Finch Avenue West where it enters a short tunnel curving under the intersection to continue on the surface towards Finch West station. Between Humber College station and the portal on Finch Avenue, there are no level crossings.

Humber College Bus Terminal 
Humber College Bus Terminal was opened on September 1, 2015. The terminal is served by the TTC, Miway, Brampton Transit, Züm, and York Region Transit.

The bus terminal is bounded by the Barrett Centre for Technology Innovation to the south, Aboretum Boulevard to the east, Spruce Vista on the north side and Silver Bell Lane on the west side. The terminal has 10 bus bays: 6 bays are along an island platform on the south side of Spruce Vista, 3 bays are along a side platform next to the Barrett Centre, and 1 platform is on the west side of Silver Bell Lane. Platforms have waiting shelters and next bus displays.

TTC buses

The TTC bus routes serving the present bus terminal are:

The proposed TTC bus routes to serve Humber College station when Line 6 opens are :

Regional buses
The following regional bus routes serve the terminal:

References

External links

Line 6 Finch West stations
Railway stations in Canada at university and college campuses
Humber College